Saradit, also spelled as Saradeet, is a small village in Jhadol (Jharol) tahsil (Udaipur district, Rajasthan state, India). It is the birthplace of Archer Limba Ram.

References

Villages in Udaipur district